Anita Majumdar is a Canadian actress and playwright. She is best known for her role in the CBC television film Murder Unveiled for which she received the Best Actress award at the 2005 Asian Festival of First Films.

Personal life

The daughter of Bengali immigrants from India, Majumdar grew up in Port Moody, Canada. She did not speak English until the age of six. She is trained in several forms of classical dance, including Bharata Natyam, Kathak and Odissi. Majumdar graduated from the University of British Columbia where she earned degrees in English, Theatre and South Asian Languages. In 2004, she graduated from the National Theatre School of Canada.

Career
She first came to attention with her one-woman play Fish Eyes in which she played three different parts.   
She was cast as Davinder Samra in the CBC television film Murder Unveiled. In the film she plays a fictionalised version of Jaswinder Kaur Sidhu, a Canadian Sikh beautician who was murdered by her family after she secretly married a poor Indian rickshaw driver. She won the Best Actress Award at the 2005 Asian Festival of First Films for her performance in the film. She then wrote a one-woman play based on the film called The Misfit. Majumdar was cast in Diverted as Alia, a passenger whose plane is diverted as a result of the September 11 attacks and falls in love with Shawn Ashmore. She also plays the character of Emerald in Deepa Mehta's adaptation of Midnight's Children.

Work

Film and television
1998 - Principal Takes a Holiday - Student
2005 - Murder Unveiled - Davinder Samra
2009 - Diverted - Alia Ramaswami
2011 - Republic of Doyle - Episode: "The Son Also Rises" - Michelle Richmond
2012 - Midnight's Children - Emerald
2012 - Gavin Crawford's Wild West - Liz

Stage
2004 - Tales from Ovid
2005 - Fish Eyes
2006 - Bloom
2006 - Bombay Black
2008 - The Misfit
2009 - Aisha n' Ben
2009 - Shakuntala
2010 - Oy! Just Beat It!
2010 - Ali & Ali: The Deportation Hearings
2011 - Rice Boy
2014 - Same Same But Different
2019 - A Thousand Splendid Suns

References

External links
 
Interview with Anita Majumdar

National Theatre School of Canada alumni
University of British Columbia alumni
Canadian film actresses
Canadian people of Indian descent
Canadian people of Bengali descent
Canadian Hindus
Canadian stage actresses
Canadian television actresses
Canadian women dramatists and playwrights
People from Port Moody
Living people
Actresses from British Columbia
21st-century Canadian dramatists and playwrights
Canadian actresses of Indian descent
21st-century Canadian women writers
Year of birth missing (living people)